Alex Foster may refer to:

Alex Foster (musician) (born 1953), American jazz saxophone player
Alex Foster (ice hockey) (born 1984), American ice hockey forward
Alex Foster (rugby league) (born 1993), English professional rugby league player
Alex Foster (athlete) (born 1970), Costa Rican Olympic hurdler
Alex Henry Foster, Canadian singer-songwriter and musician
Alex Foster; see List of EastEnders characters (2012)#Others

See also
Alexander Foster (disambiguation)
Alex Forster (born 1993), Australian rules footballer